The National Bingo Game is a 'main stage' bingo rather than an interval, tabletop, or a side game. It is operated by the National Bingo Game Association based in the UK and is played in majority of the licensed British bingo clubs every day except Christmas Day.

Origin of the National Bingo Game 
The game was introduced under the UK legislation as a game of multiple bingo. The was launched in June, 1986. The technology became available whereby clubs were able to connect to a game control center via modem to receive a pre-selected list of numbers which were called in the same time window in each participating bingo club.

Clubs then relayed the details of the winner in their club back to the game control, who would then award the National Prize to the club whose winner had claimed the lowest number of calls across the country and Regional Prizes to the clubs whose winners had claimed in the lowest number of calls in the given regions.

Game Format 
The format and pricing of the game had changed several times since its launch. The original price was 25 pence per ticket, but this has changed to 30 pence, 40 pence, 50 pence and £2 for six tickets, among others. Prize money has also varied during these changes. Presently, pricing is £1 for two tickets or £2 for five tickets and offers Jackpot Prizes of £50,000, £1,000, and £100 as well as a house prize in every club. Technology has improved since the game began in 1986 and currently an ADSL-secure internet connection is used to collect and distribute data.

Controversy 
The National Bingo Game has been in operation for over 35 years, operating under both The Gaming Board of Great Britain and The Gambling Commission.
 
There have been a few controversial incidents with winners in the past. Of these incidents, the majority of cases have been related to disagreements between players, where informal agreements between players to each share their winnings with the other/s, have not been honored.  That said, there are also cases where some bingo customers share their major winnings with fellow bingo players, even when they are not present in the club.  However, as these are independent agreements made between players, the National Bingo Game Association, as operator of the game, has no official role in resolving such disputes.

Over the past 35 years, there have also been a couple of occasions where underage players have gained admission to a participating club and purchased tickets for the National Bingo Game. As clubs are managed by independent operators, the National Bingo Game has no direct control over this issue; however, operators are extremely diligent in trying to ensure no underage gambling takes place. Players participating in the National Bingo Game must be over 18 as an underage player would, by law and under the rules of the game, be ineligible to participate or claim any prize.

National Lottery 
Until 1994, the National Bingo Game was Britain's largest computer-controlled gambling game until the National Lottery was launched. The lottery had a negative impact on attendances at bingo clubs, although the game underwent several changes in an attempt to boost prize money and compete with the lottery. Over £1 billion has been paid out in prize money since the National Bingo Game was launched.

Rollover Jackpots 
In September 2007, bingo operators were allowed to introduce rollover jackpots for the first time and the National Bingo Game introduced the "Big N" – an optional £1 jackpot charge to players which gave them a chance to play for a gold, silver or platinum jackpot which could exceed £1 million.

Ticket sales for the jackpot were lower than anticipated and the prize was not won for a number of months before the National Bingo Game decided to reduce the participation charge to 50p, but make it compulsory from January 2008. As a result of this move, 3 jackpots worth at least $1 million were created in the 6 months that followed. However Gala Bingo's decision in September 2008 to withdraw from the National Bingo Game to launch a competing jackpot product meant that further revisions to the game became necessary.

In November 2007, the first Gold Prize winner won the first "Big'N" prize of £556,000 by getting 6 of the 7 Big'N numbers, in Gala Club, East Ham, London. The winner, a married mother of three, used the proceeds to leave Newham and start a new life in Suffolk in a three-bedroomed house. When she won the prize, the room went wild, with players clapping and cheering while the winner herself sat motionless at the table, stunned by her success.

Biggest Wins 
 The biggest win ever was on 23 March 2008, when Soraya Lowell from Motherwell, North Lanarkshire scooped GBP £1,167,795 (USD $1,437,897.25). The game was played in the Club 3000 bingo hall in Coatbridge

National Bingo Game Caller of the Year 
The National Bingo Game has in the past operated a competition to find the best bingo caller in GB – the caller of the year competition. Regional heats were held across the country with each winner going forward to the national final. The competition was suspended in 2008 and reintroduced in 2019, as a biennial event.

Recent winners:-

2022 Benj Maycock (Click here for more info...), Club 3000
2019 Donna Kunyo, Club 3000
2008 competition suspended
2007 Blake Robson, Mecca
2006 Brett Hyrjak
2005 Karl Seth
2004 Mandy Gargan
2003 Mike Vyse
2002 Peter Lewis
2001 Alan Stockdale
2000 Phil Groom
1999 Steve Linder

References
National Bingo Game website

External links 

Official site

Bingo
1986 establishments in the United Kingdom